Robert Dannemann (February 6, 1902 – September 28, 1965) was a German politician of the Free Democratic Party (FDP) and former member of the German Bundestag.

Life 
In the first federal election in 1949, he was directly elected to parliament for the FDP in the Oldenburg - Ammerland constituency. He also won the constituency in 1953.

Literature

References

1902 births
1965 deaths
Members of the Bundestag for Lower Saxony
Members of the Bundestag 1953–1957
Members of the Bundestag 1949–1953
Members of the Bundestag for the Free Democratic Party (Germany)